Lieutenant General Deon Ferreira  (died 2002) was a South African Army officer. He served as Chief of Joint Operations before his retirement.

Early life

Military career 
He served in the infantry corps and later with the rank of colonel commanded 32 Battalion from 1978 - 1982 in the Bush War. He commanded 20 Brigade and Natal Command. Before being appointed as CJ Ops he was the commander of Eastern Transvaal Command until 1997.

Awards and decorations

References

1946 births
2002 deaths
South African Army generals
South African military personnel of the Border War
South African people of Portuguese descent